Lauderdale-by-the-Sea is a town in Broward County, Florida, United States, situated 33 miles north of Miami. As of the 2020 census, the population was 6,198. It is part of the Miami–Fort Lauderdale–West Palm Beach Metropolitan Statistical Area, which was home to 5,564,635 people at the 2010 census.

Geography

Lauderdale-by-the-Sea is located at  (26.189561, –80.097756).

The southern half of Lauderdale-by-the-Sea is situated between Fort Lauderdale and the Village of Sea Ranch Lakes, Florida. The Town's northern municipal neighbor is Pompano Beach. The entire town is located on a long, narrow barrier island separated from the mainland by the Intracoastal Waterway (spanned by one drawbridge at Commercial Boulevard), stretching approximately one-half dozen blocks to the Atlantic Ocean. The town is centered on the junction of State Road A1A and Commercial Boulevard. The main industry is tourism; the town has many hotels and motels used by visitors, especially during the winter; many of its older hotels and buildings reflect mid-century modern architecture design [MiMo]. Recognized by the Florida Legislature in 2016 for its near-shore coral reefs and efforts to promote scuba diving, the town is known as Florida's Beach Diving Capital. With a coral reef just 100 yards offshore, the town is a popular spot for scuba divers, especially just south of Anglin's Pier.

On the ocean at the east end of Commercial Boulevard is Anglin's Fishing Pier, named after Lauderdale-by-the-Sea's first mayor, Melvin I. Anglin. The town is home to SS Copenhagen, a 19th-century British steamship that wrecked in 25 feet of water in May 1900 after striking a coral reef. The historic site is a Florida archaeological underwater preserve and is listed on the National Register of Historic Places. The town doubled in size in 2001 when it annexed the unincorporated Intracoastal Beach Area to the north. The area included the neighborhoods of Bel Air and Terra Mar Island. Even though the town's permanent population is 6,056, it nearly doubles when snowbirds and tourists come here to spend the winter. The Town underwent a major transformation in 2013, when it completed a streetscape project between the Commercial Boulevard Bridge and the ocean. Sidewalks were widened and enhanced with brick pavers as well as landscaping.

Two new public plazas were added in Anglin's Square and furnished with colorful "Addy" chairs, boat benches and bike racks shaped like fish. Each of the four business plazas on Commercial were outfitted with coral reef themed artworks (parrotfish, green turtle, eagle ray and sea fan), reflecting the town's ties with the ocean. An 18-foot coral reef sculpture also greets visitors as they enter the town over the intracoastal waterway.

Demographics

As of 2010, there were 6,563 households, out of which 45.2% were vacant.

2020 census

As of the 2020 United States census, there were 6,198 people, 4,003 households, and 1,730 families residing in the town.

2010 census

Media

Lauderdale-by-the-Sea is a part of the Miami-Fort Lauderdale-Hollywood media market, which is the twelfth largest radio market and the seventeenth largest television market in the United States. Its primary daily newspapers are the South Florida Sun-Sentinel and The Miami Herald. There are currently no newspapers based in Lauderdale-by-the-Sea, although the neighboring weekly, The Pompano Pelican regularly covers the community.

Education

Broward County Public Schools operates public schools. Zoned schools include:
 Elementary schools: McNab and Bayview
 Middle schools: Pompano Beach and Sunrise
 High schools: Fort Lauderdale, Northeast, and Blanche Ely

In addition the community is in the service area of the magnet school Pompano Beach High School.

References

Further reading

External links

 Town of Lauderdale-by-the-Sea events website
 Lauderdale-by-the-Sea Chamber of Commerce

Towns in Broward County, Florida
Seaside resorts in Florida
Towns in Florida
Populated coastal places in Florida on the Atlantic Ocean
Beaches of Broward County, Florida
Beaches of Florida